Cerodrillia porcellana is a species of sea snail, a marine gastropod mollusc in the family Drilliidae.

Description
The length of the shell varies between 4.5 mm and 11 mm.

Distribution
This marine species occurs off the Campeche Bank, Mexico.

References

 Fallon P.J. (2016). Taxonomic review of tropical western Atlantic shallow water Drilliidae (Mollusca: Gastropoda: Conoidea) including descriptions of 100 new species. Zootaxa. 4090(1): 1–363

External links
 

porcellana
Gastropods described in 2016